DIFC towers is a complex of two supertall vision skyscrapers in DIFC, Dubai, UAE. DIFC tower 1 will have 100 floors and DIFC tower 2 will have 75 floors. The two towers will be connected by three bridges. It is planned that 85 percent of the towers will be office space and the remaining space will be retail and apartments. DIFC towers will be the second office tower in Dubai after Lighthouse tower, which incorporates wind turbines so that the building will be able to reduce the consumption of energy and water by 65 and 40 percent respectively. A total of 4,000 solar panels will be installed in the towers. 

The DIFC towers will cost around US$816.7 million.

See also

List of tallest buildings in Dubai

External links

Emporis.com DIFC Complex
Emporis.com DIFC Tower 1
 Emporis.com DIFC Tower 2
CTBUH

Proposed skyscrapers in Dubai